Accelerators are a form of selection-based search that allows a user to invoke an online service from any other page using only the mouse introduced by Microsoft in Internet Explorer 8. Actions such as selecting the text or other objects will give users access to the usable Accelerator services (such as blogging with the selected text, or viewing a map of a selected geographical location), which can then be invoked with the selected object. According to Microsoft, Accelerators eliminate the need to copy and paste content between web pages. IE8 specifies an XML-based encoding which allows a web application or web service to be invoked as an Accelerator service. How the service will be invoked and for what categories of content it will show up are specified in the XML file. Similarities have been drawn between Accelerators and the controversial smart tags feature experimented with in the IE 6 Beta but withdrawn after criticism (though later included in MS Office).

Support for Accelerators was removed in Microsoft Edge, the successor browser to Internet Explorer.

History

Microsoft introduced accelerators in Internet Explorer 8 Beta 1 as "activities". It later renamed this to "accelerators".

IE8
Accelerators are included in IE8 by default as a type of add-on.

Sample Accelerator
This is an example of how to describe a map Accelerator using the OpenService Format:

<?xml version="1.0" encoding="UTF-8"?>
<openServiceDescription xmlns="http://www.microsoft.com/schemas/openservicedescription/1.0">
  <homepageUrl>http://www.example.com</homepageUrl>
  <display>
    <name>Map with Example.com</name>
    <icon>http://www.example.com/favicon.ico</icon>
  </display>
  <activity category="map">
    <activityAction context="selection">
      <preview action="http://www.example.com/geotager.html">
        <parameter name="b" value="{selection}"/>
        <parameter name="clean" value="true"/>
        <parameter name="w" value="320"/>
        <parameter name="h" value="240"/>
      </preview>
      <execute action="http://www.example.com/default.html">
        <parameter name="where1" value="{selection}" type="text"/>
      </execute>
    </activityAction>
  </activity>
</openServiceDescription>

See also
 Smart tag
 Web Slice
 Ubiquity (Firefox)
 click.to (browser independent)

References

External links
 Accelerators Video, Microsoft Internet Explorer 8 Videos
 Add-ons Gallery: Accelerators, Microsoft Internet Explorer 8

Development
 OpenService Accelerators Developer Guide
 Accelerators, Internet Explorer 8 Readiness Toolkit

Wikimedia Accelerators
 Wikipedia Visual Search, IE8 Addons Gallery
 Define with Wikipedia, IE8 Addons Gallery
 Define with Wiktionary, IE8 Addons Gallery
 Veoh Video Compass, IE8 Addons Gallery 

User interface techniques
Internet Explorer
Microsoft initiatives